Andy Shauf is a Canadian singer-songwriter from Regina, Saskatchewan.  He plays several instruments, including clarinet.

Early life
Shauf was born in Estevan, Saskatchewan, grew up in Bienfait, and later moved to Regina.  His parents ran an electronics and music store, giving him access to a variety of instruments. He played Christian music with his parents.

Career

Shauf was a drummer in the Christian pop punk band Captain until 2006.

He released his debut album, Darker Days, in 2009, and followed up with the EPs Waiting for the Sun to Leave (2010) and Sam Jones Feeds His Demons (2012).

He released the album The Bearer of Bad News independently in 2012. The album was re-released in 2015 on Tender Loving Empire and Party Damage Records.

In 2015, Shauf signed to Arts & Crafts Productions in Canada and ANTI- internationally, releasing the non-album single "Jenny Come Home" as his first release on both labels. "Jenny Come Home" was Shauf's breakthrough on Canadian radio, charting on both CBC Radio 2's Radio 2 Top 20 and CBC Radio 3.

Through early 2016, he toured Europe as an opening act for The Lumineers. He moved from Saskatchewan to Toronto in April, and his album, The Party, was released in May.  After some experimental recordings with a group of musicians, Shauf ended up playing almost all of the instruments on the album himself, recording the tracks sequentially.

His song "Wendell Walker" from The Bearer of Bad News was shortlisted for the 2016 SOCAN Songwriting Prize, and The Party was a shortlisted finalist for the 2016 Polaris Music Prize. Following the release he toured throughout 2017 accompanied with a five-piece band that included multi-instrumentalist Karen Ng.

In 2018 Shauf recorded an album with D.A. Kissick, Avery Kissick and Dallas Bryson, under the band name Foxwarren. The album was released on 30 November 2018, and received a Juno Award nomination for Alternative Album of the Year at the Juno Awards of 2020.

On 23 October 2019, Shauf announced that a new album, The Neon Skyline, would be released 24 January 2020. A single, "Things I Do," was released the same day.

After the release of The Neon Skyline, Barack Obama featured the title track on his 2020 summer playlist. Commenting on this honor, Shauf stated, "It’s cool to think that Obama, or the Obamas together, have listened to my music. It’s a really nice feeling to think my music has gone that far."

Discography

Albums

EPs
Tour EP (2009)
Four Songs (2009)
Waiting for the Sun to Leave (2010)
Sam Jones Feeds His Demons (2012)

with Foxwarren
Has Been Defeated (2011) 
Foxwarren (2018)

Awards and nominations

References

Canadian indie rock musicians
Canadian male singer-songwriters
Canadian singer-songwriters
Musicians from Saskatchewan
People from Estevan
Living people
Canadian folk rock musicians
Arts & Crafts Productions artists
21st-century Canadian male singers
1986 births
Anti- (record label) artists